Wilhelm Cerny (born 30 January 1955) is an Austrian footballer. He played in two matches for the Austria national football team in 1976.

References

External links
 
 

1955 births
Living people
Austrian footballers
Austria international footballers
Place of birth missing (living people)
Association football midfielders
FC Admira Wacker Mödling players
Wiener Sport-Club players
FC Red Bull Salzburg players